The Lady Outlaw is a 1911 Australian silent film set in Van Diemen's Land during convict days.

It was also known as By His Excellency's Command or By His Excellency's Command, a Tale of a Lady Outlaw.

It is considered a lost film.

Plot
In the 1860s, Dorothy's lover is transported to Hobart for committing a crime. She follows him there only to discover he has been assigned as a servant to a villainous land owner and has escaped to the hills, where police believe he has died.

Dorothy decides to seek revenge and leads a group of escape convicts on raids on the land owner's house. She then discovers her lover is alive and married to another woman. She decides to remain a bushranger until she gets involved in a shoot out by the sea.

After a duel between a lieutenant and her last surviving follower, she is captured by police.

The chapter headings were:
 Arrested-for Forgery
 Transported for Life
 A Woman's Devotion
 Lieutenant Dashwood escapes
 Struggle on the Cliffs
 Dashed to Death
 A Bid-for Freedom
 A Free Pardon

Cast
 Charles Villiers
 Alice Emslie

Production
The film was shot in New South Wales and featured a bushfire scene.

It starred Alice Emslie, a champion horsewoman, in the lead role.

Release
The film was previewed in Melbourne in August 1911.

The Hobart Mercury'' reported that "the picture is described as one of the finest yet shown in Hobart, and the novelty of the subject should bo the means of drawing large houses."

References

External links
 
 The Lady Outlaw at AustLit

1911 films
1911 Western (genre) films
1911 lost films
Australian black-and-white films
Bushranger films
Films directed by Alfred Rolfe
Lost Australian films
Lost Western (genre) films
Silent Australian Western (genre) films